Macrobathra eudesma is a moth in the family Cosmopterigidae. It was described by Oswald Bertram Lower in 1900. It is found in Australia.

References

Macrobathra
Moths described in 1900